The Emotional Plague is the second and final studio album by the band Supreme Dicks, released on April 30, 1996 through Homestead Records.

Track listing

Personnel 
Supreme Dicks
Mark Hanson – bass guitar, drums, vocals
Daniel Oxenberg – guitar, vocals
Steven Shavel – slide guitar, vocals
Jon Shere – guitar, vocals
Jim Spring – guitar
Production and additional personnel
Benjamin Ijagun – engineering

References

External links 
 

1996 albums
Homestead Records albums
Supreme Dicks albums